Mary Tappan Wright (1851–1916) was an American novelist<ref name="Wallace">Wallace, W. Stewart. A Dictionary of North American Authors Deceased before 1950. Toronto: Ryerson Press, 1951, p. 520.</ref> and short story writer best known for her acute characterizations and depictions of academic life. She was the wife of classical scholar John Henry WrightAdams, Oscar Fay. A Dictionary of American Authors. 5th ed. Boston: Houghton Mifflin and Company, 1904, p. 438.Herringshaw, Thomas William, ed. Herringshaw's National Library of American Biography. Chicago, American Publishers' Association, 1914, p. 784. and the mother of legal scholar and utopian novelist Austin Tappan Wright and geographer John Kirtland Wright.

Life and family
Wright was born Mary Tappan December 14, 1851, in Steubenville, Ohio,Warner, Charles Dudley, ed. Biographical Dictionary and Synopsis of Books Ancient and Modern. Akron, Ohio: Werner Co., 1902, p. 619.Who's Who in New England. 2nd ed. Chicago : A. N. Marquis & Company, 1916. p. 1186. or December 18 of the same year, the daughter of Eli Todd Tappan, president of Kenyon College, and Lydia (McDowell) Tappan. She was educated at Auburn Young Ladies' Institute, Cincinnati, Ohio. She married, April 2, 1878, John Henry Wright, then an associate professor of Greek at Dartmouth College and later professor of classical philology and dean of the Collegiate Board of Johns Hopkins University, professor of Greek at Harvard University, and dean of Harvard's Graduate School of Arts and Sciences. The couple had three children, Elizabeth Tappan Wright (who died young), Austin Tappan Wright, and John Kirtland Wright. They lived successively in Hanover, New Hampshire, Baltimore, Maryland and Cambridge, Massachusetts, aside from one period during which John was a professor at the American School of Classical Studies at Athens, when they resided in Greece. Wright was a founding member of the Boston Authors Club in 1900. Her husband died November 25, 1908, and she herself died August 25, 1916 in Cambridge."Death Notices" – article, Boston Journal, August 28, 1916, p. 11. She was survived by her two sons.

Career

Works
Wright and her husband are said to have "worked together on their literary activities." Wright's first known published story was "How They Cured Him", which appeared in The Youth's Companion (March 24, 1887), one of several written for that periodical. Some of the Youth's Companion tales form a loose series centering on holidays and featuring recurring characters; some of the early Dulwich tales were also published in that magazine. However, Wright's tales for Scribner's Magazine, beginning with "As Haggards of the Rock" (May 1890), attracted more notice, and the initial six of them, including also "A Truce", "A Portion of the Tempest", "From Macedonia", "Deep as First Love", and "A Fragment of a Play, With a Chorus", were collected in her first book, A Truce, and Other Stories (1895). None of her other short stories were gathered into book form in her lifetime.

Much of her fiction dealt with American university life, often set in the fictional college town she called Dulwich in her short stories and The Test, and Great Dulwich in her other novels, which combines elements of both Kenyon College and Harvard University. Her novels are all set in college towns, the third and fourth in Dulwich itself (the first and second also mention it peripherally). Her first novel, Aliens (1902), attracted much attention when it appeared for its portrait of contemporary northerners in the racially tense Southern town of Tallawara. The next, The Test (1904), the story of a wronged young woman, received mixed reviews for what some perceived as its unpleasant subject matter and unsympathetic characters, though it was generally praised as well written. The Tower (1906) was described as "a love story placed against the life of a college community taken from the faculty side and told with deep understanding and the most delicate art" and The Charioteers (1912) as "a story of the social life and environment of college professors and their families."

Wright's first four books were published by Charles Scribner's Sons, the fifth being issued by D. Appleton & Company after having been rejected by the Houghton Mifflin Company. Close to half of her short pieces appeared in Scribner's Magazine; others appeared in The Youth's Companion, Christian Union and its successor The Outlook, The Independent, Harper's Magazine, Harper's Weekly, and an anthology of works by various authors. She also contributed a book review to the North American Review.

All of Wright's novels are currently available in e-editions on Book Search. Aliens was reprinted by Kessinger Publishing, LLC, in June, 2007; The Tower was reprinted by Kessinger in December, 2008. Wright's previously uncollected short stories were issued in new collections by Fleabonnet Press from December, 2007-November 2008.

Critical reception
In her writing Wright was praised as having "a keen sense of humor, good descriptive powers, a good working knowledge of human nature, an effective style" and the ability to "tell a story well."  Her skill at characterization was also noted.

Papers
Wright's papers, including correspondence and original manuscripts and fragments, are found in various archival collections at the Harvard University Library and the Houghton Library at Harvard College. An early commonplace book from 1870–77, containing mostly poetry, is in the Stone-Wright family papers at the Massachusetts Historical Society.

Bibliography

NovelsAliens (1902) (Google e-text)The Test (1904) (Google e-text)The Tower (1906) (Dulwich series) (Google e-text)The Charioteers (1912) (Dulwich series) (Google e-text)

CollectionsA Truce, and Other Stories (1895) (e-text)Pro Tempore, and Other Stories (2007) (e-text)Dead Letters, and Other Pieces (2008) (e-text)Beginning Alone, and Other Stories (2008) (e-text)Uncollected Works (2008) (e-text)

Short stories
"How They Cured Him" (Mar. 1887) (Holiday series) (Google e-text) (another e-text)
"Alice's Christmas" (Dec. 1889) (Holiday series) (e-text)
"Numbered With Thy Saints" (Apr. 1890) (Dulwich series) (e-text)
"As Haggards of the Rock" (May 1890) (Making of America e-text) (another e-text)
"Beginning Alone" (Sep.-Oct. 1890) (Dulwich series) (e-text)
"A Truce" (Jan. 1891) (Making of America e-text) (another e-text)
"A Fragment of a Play, With a Chorus" (May 1891) (Making of America e-text) (another e-text)
"Divided Allegiances" (Feb. 1892) (e-text)
"A Lad—Dismissed" (Jul.-Aug. 1893) (e-text)
"The Gray Fur Rug" (Nov. 1893) (Holiday series) (e-text)
"Deep as First Love" (Feb. 1894) (Making of America e-text) (another e-text)
"A Portion of the Tempest" (Jun. 1894) (Jackson series) (Making of America e-text) (another e-text)
"His Last" (Jun. 1894; reprinted as "His Last Offence, A Story of College Life", 1900) (Dulwich series) (e-text)
"From Macedonia" (Oct. 1894) (Jackson series) (Making of America e-text) (another e-text)
"Three Fires at Redmont" (Jun. 1895) (e-text)
"Cunliffe" (Sep. 1896) (Google e-text) (another e-text)
"The Key of the Fields" (Feb. 1898) (Making of America e-text) (another e-text)
"An Exception" (Jan. 1899) (Google e-text) (another e-text)
"Ethel's Christmas Brother" (Jan. 20 1900) (Google e-text) (another e-text)
"The Best Laid Plans" (ca.1901)
"A Day Together" (Jan. 1901) (Google e-text) (another e-text)
"Dead Letters" (Sep. 1901) (Dulwich series) (e-text)
"A Sacred Concert" (Jul. 1903) (Dulwich series) (Google e-text) (another e-text)
"Vox" (Oct. 1903) (Google e-text) (another e-text)
"Pro Tempore" (Jun. 1906) (Dulwich series) (Google e-text) (another e-text)
"The Mountain" (Feb. 1907) (e-text)
"Asphodel" (Oct. 1909) (Google e-text) (another e-text)

Non-fiction
"Children and Books" (article) (Mar. 3 1900) (Google e-text) (another e-text)
"The Iron Woman" (review of the novel by Margaret Deland) (Dec. 1911) (e-text)

Footnotes

General references
Coyle, William, ed. Ohio Authors and Their Books. Biographical data and selective bibliographies for Ohio authors, native and resident, 1796–1950''. Cleveland: World Publishing Co., 1962.

External links
 
The Works of Mary Tappan Wright Online
Entry for Wright on Frank Parlato Jr.'s Swami Vivekananda site

20th-century American novelists
19th-century American women writers
20th-century American women writers
American women novelists
American women short story writers
Novelists from Ohio
Writers from Cambridge, Massachusetts
People from Steubenville, Ohio
1851 births
1916 deaths
19th-century American short story writers
20th-century American short story writers
Novelists from Massachusetts